The 2012–13 Federal Hockey League season was the third season of the Federal Hockey League.

Regular season 

 Advanced to playoffs

Playoffs

External links 
 Federal Hockey League website

Federal Hockey League
2012